Dorset County Council was a non-metropolitan county in England. Elections were first held on 23 January 1889, thereafter elections were held every three years, with all members being elected by the first past the post system of election on the same day. Later, the cycle was changed to one election in every four years, and the last such election was in 2017. There were also occasional by-elections, the last of which took place in December 2016.

Under the Local Government Act 1972 the non-metropolitan county of Dorset was created from the merger of the administrative county of Dorset and the county borough of Bournemouth. The first elections to the new authority were in April 1973, and the council took office on 1 April 1974. From its creation until 1997, the county council administered the entire area of the ceremonial county of Dorset. Bournemouth and Poole became unitary authorities in 1997, but continued to form part of the county for ceremonial purposes.

The council was abolished on 31 March 2019 as part of structural changes to local government in Dorset.

Political control
From the first election in 1973 following the reforms of the Local Government Act 1972 until the council's abolition in 2019, political control of the council was held by the following parties:

Leadership
The leaders of the council from 2006 until the council's abolition in 2019 were:

Rebecca Knox served as the leader for the shadow authority created in 2018 to oversee the transition to the successor Dorset Council, but at the first meeting of the new council after it came into effect Spencer Flower was appointed leader.

County council composition

Composition since 1973

County result maps

By-election results
By-elections occur when seats become vacant between council elections. Below is a summary of recent by-elections; full by-election results can be found by clicking on the by-election name.

References

 
Council elections in Dorset
County council elections in England